John Gilchrist (15 April 1900 – 1950) was a Scottish footballer, who played for Celtic, Preston North End, Carlisle United, Third Lanark and Scotland.

Career
Gilchrist signed for Celtic in 1919 from junior side St Anthony's, where he had won the Scottish Junior Cup. He made his debut on 18 August 1919 in a league match against Dumbarton, the first of 134 league and Scottish Cup appearances for Celtic. He turned in impressive performances at half-back, which saw him capped for Scotland in April 1922, a 1–0 win over England at Villa Park. In that campaign he made 48 club appearances as Celtic won the 1921–22 Scottish Division One title. However, Gilchrist had a strained relationship with manager Willie Maley whose disciplinary orders he was reluctant to follow. He was warned several times for his poor attitude towards training, before eventually being suspended sine die for "wilful inattention to training" in January 1923.

On 23 January, Gilchrist signed for Preston North End for a reported transfer fee of £4,500. He was not a success at Preston and almost exactly a year later the club terminated his contract. After a brief spell as player-coach at Carlisle United, he moved back to Scotland in the summer of 1924 to join Third Lanark. He played only three games there before he was sold on to Dunfermline. Again, his stay was very brief and he lasted less than a month in Fife.

His career in football was now all but over. In the summer of 1925, he sailed to New York. He joined Brooklyn Wanderers but made just six appearances, then finally had a year at Pawtucket Rangers, playing only three games in his time there.

References

External links

1900 births
1950 deaths
Date of death missing
Sportspeople from Kirkintilloch
Footballers from Glasgow
Scottish footballers
Scotland international footballers
Celtic F.C. players
Preston North End F.C. players
Carlisle United F.C. players
Third Lanark A.C. players
Scottish Football League players
Scottish Football League representative players
Association football wing halves
Scottish expatriate footballers
Expatriate soccer players in the United States
International Soccer League players
American Soccer League (1921–1933) players
Brooklyn Wanderers players
Pawtucket Rangers players
Strathclyde F.C. players
St Anthony's F.C. players
Scottish Junior Football Association players
Scotland junior international footballers